The 1946 Wightman Cup was the 18th edition of the annual women's team tennis competition between the United States and Great Britain. It was held at the All England Lawn Tennis and Croquet Club in London in England in the United Kingdom.

References

1946
1946 in tennis
1946 in American tennis
1946 in British sport
1946 in women's tennis
1946 sports events in London
1946 in English tennis